Starvation Flats is an area in the San Bernardino Mountains near Big Bear Lake, California.  It was originally a settlement of the Native American Serrano people for thousands of years.

History
Starvation Flats was an open mountain plain that with occasional grizzly bears. In 1845, Don Benito Wilson and 22 other men rode into the area in search of rustlers, but found only bears. In the years following, homesteaders came into the region to stake their claims. However, due to the poor soil and continuously bad crops, they found continuous trouble living there.

Eventually, they enlisted William F. Holcomb, who was widely known as "the best sharpshooter west of the Mississippi", to exterminate the grizzly bears. He was successful in his extermination, and so creating safety for the new homesteaders. He eventually went on to discover gold and found Holcomb Valley.

See also
 California Gold Rush
 Holcomb Valley

External links

References

San Bernardino Mountains
Valleys of California
Valleys of San Bernardino County, California